Lijeska may refer to:
 Lijeska, Bijelo Polje, Montenegro
 Lijeska, Pljevlja, Montenegro